Arcugi is a village in western Eritrea. It is located in Omhajer District in the Gash-Barka region. It lies inside the Gash-Setit wildlife reserve 6 kilometres south-west of Giamal Biscia.

As the name may suggest, the village was founded by the Italians during the occupation.

It lies 12.7 miles south-east of Teseney.

Villages in Eritrea